Zajasovnik is a dispersed settlement that is divided between the municipalities of Kamnik and Vransko in Slovenia.

Cultural heritage

An Austro-Hungarian boundary stone marking the border between Carniola and Styria stands at the border between the two parts of Zajasovnik.

References

External links

Zajasovnik (Kamnik) on Geopedia
Zajasovnik (Vransko) on Geopedia

Populated places in the Municipality of Kamnik
Populated places in the Municipality of Vransko